The 122nd Boat Race, an annual side-by-side rowing race between crews from the Universities of Oxford and Cambridge along the River Thames, took place on 20 March 1976 and was won by Oxford by  lengths in 16 minutes 58 seconds, the fastest time in the history of the race.  The race was umpired by former Cambridge rower Farn Carpmael. It was the first race in the event for which an official weigh-in was held, and featured the heaviest rower ever in Steve Plunkett.

Oxford's Isis won the 12th running of the reserve race against Cambridge's Goldie, in a record time of 17 minutes 37 seconds.  In the 31st Women's Boat Race, Oxford defeated Cambridge.

Background
The Boat Race is a side-by-side rowing competition between the University of Oxford (sometimes referred to as the "Dark Blues") and the University of Cambridge (sometimes referred to as the "Light Blues").  The race was first held in 1829, and since 1845 has taken place on the  Championship Course on the River Thames in southwest London.  The rivalry is a "hotly contested point of honour" between the two universities.  Cambridge went into the race as reigning champions, having won the 1975 race by  lengths, and led overall with 68 victories to Oxford's 52 (excluding the "dead heat" of 1877).  The umpire for the race was Farn Carpmael, who had rowed for Cambridge in the 1930 and 1931 races.

The first Women's Boat Race took place in 1927, but did not become an annual fixture until the 1960s. Up until 2014, the contest was conducted as part of the Henley Boat Races, but as of the 2015 race, it is held on the River Thames, on the same day as the men's main and reserve races.  The reserve race, contested between Oxford's Isis boat and Cambridge's Goldie boat has been held since 1965.  It usually takes place on the Tideway, prior to the main Boat Race.

By invitation from the Oxford boat club president Graham Innes, Oxford were coached by Dan Topolski (who had rowed for the Dark Blues in the 1967 and 1968 races) while Cambridge were led by Czechoslovakian former international rower Bohumil Janoušek (more commonly known as Bob Janousek).  Preparations during the week before the race were underwhelming for both crews.  Oxford's performance against a University of London crew was described by Jim Railton of The Times as "abysmal" while Cambridge "disgraced themselves" in a subsequent two-and-a-half-length defeat by their own reserve crew, Goldie.  Both crews had faced the "Lubrication Laboratory" crew from Imperial College London, a "hotbed of rowing", in the lead-up to the official race, but changes in personnel and differences in conditions and race lengths did not demonstrate a clear favourite.

The day before the race, British bookmaking company Ladbrokes announced that they would sponsor the race from the following year.  From 1977, each boat club would be awarded £10,000 and would compete for The Ladbroke Cup.

Crews
For the first time in the history of the event, an official weigh-in was held, organised by The Sunday Times and weighing machine manufacturers W & T Avery Ltd.  Oxford's crew was the heaviest of all time, at an average of just under 14 st 1 lb (89.0 kg) per rower,  more than their opposition, and the first time in the race history, a crew weighed more than an average of 14 st (88.7 kg).  The Dark Blue crew also included Steve Plunkett who, at 16 st 5 lb (103.6 kg) was the heaviest rower in the history of the race.  The Cambridge crew were inexperienced, their only Blue being the Cambridge University Boat Club president Henry Clay who had rowed in the 1975 race.  In contrast, Oxford welcomed back five of their 1975 crew including cox J. N. Calvert, and also included two from the victorious 1975 Isis crew.  Two non-British rowers participated, Americans Dick Cashin (of Harvard) for Cambridge and Ken Brown (of Cornell) for Oxford.

Race

Oxford won the toss and elected to start from the Surrey station.  Leading from the outset, and in calm river conditions, Oxford were a length ahead within a minute.  Four lengths up by the Mile Post, which they reached in a record 3 minutes 35 seconds, the Dark Blues reduced their rating. Further milestone records were broken at Hammersmith Bridge, Chiswick Steps and Barnes Bridge.  Oxford reduced their rating but still extended their lead to six lengths by the finishing post, in a record-breaking time of 16 minutes 58 seconds, 37 seconds quicker than their 1974 colleagues who had previously held the record.  Although Cambridge also beat the existing record, they finished a distant 22 seconds and  lengths behind.

Reaction
Oxford coach Topolski said of his successful crew: "they got three [lengths] up, then they really sat on it and cruised.  The enjoyed the row.  It's a natural thing when the other crew is so far behind."  He was critical of the Cambridge crew: "They didn't really have a lot of talent."

The official winning distance caused controversy.  A discrepancy between the official margin ( lengths) and those reported in various British newspapers, including The Sunday Times, The Daily Telegraph and The Times resulted in a delay in bookmakers paying out on winning bets.

References
Notes

Bibliography

External links
 Official website

The Boat Race
1976 in English sport
1976 in rowing
1976 sports events in London
March 1976 sports events in the United Kingdom